:Garista: is a debut album by the British avant-garde music group :zoviet*france:, who, when it was recorded, identified themselves as :$OVIET:FRANCE:. Recorded in December 1981, it was the first commercial album by the group, who released it themselves in 1982 in audio cassette format. Subsequently it was re-released by the music label Singing Ringing, again in audio cassette format (UK, 1985), and then by Charrm in audio cassette, 12 inch vinyl and CD formats (UK, 1990).

Track listing 
Side one
 "Scrama Mdags" – 2:28 
 "Mosbas" – 3:37
 "Mama Piss" – 3:21
 "Nrunknesh" – 2:52
 "Caarcuraz" – 5:39

Side two
 "M1 M1 M1" –  	7:24
 "Rangmabasm" – 14:23

Production details 

1982 edition
LABEL: :$OVIET:FRANCE: (UK)
CATALOGUE NUMBER: no catalogue number
FORMAT: normal bias audio cassette with hand made inlay (manually screenprinted muslin glued to card backing stained with creosote) and manually screenprinted labels.
ARTWORK: original artwork and design by :$OVIET:FRANCE:
TOTAL RUNNING TIME: 00:39:49

1985 edition
LABEL: Singing Ringing (UK)
CATALOGUE NUMBER: no catalogue number
FORMAT: normal bias audio cassette with hand made inlay (manually screenprinted muslin glued to card backing stained with creosote) and manually screenprinted labels.
ARTWORK: original artwork and design by :$OVIET:FRANCE:
TOTAL RUNNING TIME: 00:39:49

1990 edition
LABEL: Charrm (UK)
CATALOGUE NUMBERS: CHARRMTC1 (audio cassette); CHARRMLP1 (12 inch vinyl); CHARRMCD1 (CD)
FORMATS: normal bias audio cassette with hand made inlay (manually screenprinted muslin glued to card), commercially printed insert and commercially printed labels; 12 inch vinyl record with commercially printed sleeve; audio CD with commercially printed inlay and traycard.
ARTWORK: original artwork and design by :$OVIET:FRANCE:
TOTAL RUNNING TIME: 00:39:49

External links 
discogs.com, a community-built database of music information
Jim's Music Pages: :zoviet*france, a fan site with discography and cover art
pretentious.net, a fan site with discography and information

Culture in Newcastle upon Tyne
Zoviet France albums